Strophanthus courmontii grows as a deciduous liana up to  long or as a shrub up to  tall, with a stem diameter up to . Its fragrant flowers feature a white turning red and purple corolla tube, yellow with purple streaks inside. Habitats are forests and riverine thickets, from sea level to  altitude. S. courmontii is used in local medicinal treatments for rheumatism and as an aphrodisiac. The plant is native to Kenya, Tanzania, Malawi, Mozambique, Zambia and Zimbabwe.

References

courmontii
Plants described in 1893
Plants used in traditional African medicine
Flora of East Tropical Africa
Flora of South Tropical Africa